Liquor in the Front is  the third album by Reverend Horton Heat. It was jointly released by Sub Pop and Interscope Records in July 1994. Al Jourgensen of Ministry fame produced the album. The album continues the band's guitar-heavy rockabilly style flavored with punk rock, surf rock and country elements. The back cover album art displays the subtitle "Poker in the Rear".

The song "In Your Wildest Dreams" (along with "The Reverend" himself) was featured in the TV shows Homicide: Life on the Street and Midnight, Texas. "I Can't Surf" appeared in Tony Hawk's Pro Skater 3. "Baddest of the Bad"  was in Tony Hawk's Proving Ground and Dexter: New Blood. The film Free Willy 3: The Rescue featured "Big Sky".

Track listing
All songs were written by Jim Heath except as noted.
"Big Sky" – 3:07
"Baddest of the Bad" – 2:27
"One Time for Me" – 3:30
"Five-O Ford" – 2:29
"In Your Wildest Dreams" (Heath/Wallace) – 2:58
"Yeah, Right" – 2:44
"Crusin' for a Bruisin'" – 3:20
"I Could Get Used to It" – 1:58
"Liquor, Beer & Wine" (Heath/Livingston) – 3:25
"I Can't Surf" (Heath/Wallace/Bentley) – 2:41
"Jezebel" (Shanklin) – 3:11
"Rockin' Dog" – 2:38
"The Entertainer" (Joplin) – 1:14

Personnel
Jim "Reverend Horton" Heath – vocals, guitar
Jimbo Wallace – upright bass
Taz Bentley – drums
Tim Alexander – keyboards, accordion
Al Jourgensen – producer, pedal steel guitar, piano, vocals
Siavoch Ahmadzadeh – assistant engineer
Keith Rust – assistant engineer
Jeff Lane – assistant mix engineer
Barry Goldberg – assistant mix engineer
Eddy Schreyer – mastering
Kim Holt – art direction + design
Michael Lavine – band photos
Mosquito – cartoon illustrations

Chart positions

Album

Singles

References

1994 albums
The Reverend Horton Heat albums
Albums produced by Al Jourgensen
Sub Pop albums
Interscope Records albums